Ramayana is one of the two major Sanskrit ancient epics (Itihasas) of Hindu literature. It was composed by sage Valmiki. This is a list of important characters that appear in the epic.

A

Agastya 

Agastya was a son of sage Pulastya and brother of sage Vishrava. He was an uncle of Ravana. Agastya and his wife Lopamudra met Rama, Sita, and Lakshmana during their exile and gave them a divine bow and arrow.

Ahalya

Ahalya is the wife of the sage Gautama Maharishi. Many Hindu scriptures say that she was seduced by Indra (the king of gods), cursed by her husband for infidelity, and liberated from the curse by Rama (an avatar of the god Vishnu).

Akampana 
Akampan was a maternal uncle of Ravana. He was one of ten sons of Sumali and Ketumathi. He also had four sisters. He was one of the survivors of the battle between Khara and Dushana along with Shurpanakha. After escaping the deadly carnage, he instigated Ravana to kidnap Sita, thus indirectly making him one of the masterminds behind the war. Later he was killed in the battle by Hanuman.

Akshayakumara 

Akshayakumara was a  son of Ravana and Mandodari. He was killed by Hanuman during the encounter in Ashok Vatika.

Angada 

Angada was a vanara and the son of Vaali (vanar king of Kishkindha before Sugriva) and Tara. Angada helped Rama find his wife Sita and fight her abductor, Ravana.

Añjana

Añjanā was the mother of Hanuman. According to a version of the legend,  was an apsara named Puñjikastalā, who was born on Earth as a vanara princess and married Kesari, a vanara chief. Vayu, god of the wind, carried the divine power of Shiva to Anjana's womb, and thus Hanuman was born as an incarnation of Lord Shiva.In Shiv Purana Anjana is stated as the Daughter of Gautama Maharishi and Ahalya..

Atikaya 

Atikaya was a son of Ravana and his 2nd wife Dhanyamalini. He was killed by Lakshmana by the Brahmastra, after the advice given by the elemental God of Wind, Vayu at the behest of Lord Indra, that an otherwise invincible armour of Lord Brahma was granted to Atikaya, that could only be pierced by a Brahmastra, during the battle when Lakshmana struggled to kill Atikaya.

B

Bharata 

Bharata was 2nd son of King Dasharath. He was born to queen Kaikayi. Bharata was the younger half brother of Rama. Ramayana holds Bharata as a symbol of dharma and idealism. He was married to Sita's cousin Mandavi with whom he had two children.

C

Chandrabhagha 
Chandrabhagha was the wife of Janaka's younger brother Kushadhwaja (also known as Kushadbhojan). Chandrabhagha 's two daughters Mandavi and Shrutakirti were married to Rama's younger brothers Bharata and Shatrughna respectively.

D

Dasharatha 

Dasharatha was the king of Ayodhya. He had three queens, Kausalya, Kaikeyi and Sumitra, and four sons: Rama, Bharata, and twins Lakshmana, Shatrughna. Dasharatha also had a daughter named Shanta. Once, Kaikeyi saved Dasaratha in a war, and as a reward, she got the privilege from Dasaratha to fulfill two of her wishes at any time of her lifetime. She made use of the opportunity and forced Dasharatha to make their son Bharata crown prince and send Rama into exile for 14 years. Dasharatha dies heartbroken after Rama goes into exile. He was a good king, who was also very kind.

Devantaka 

Devantaka was the son of Ravana. He was killed by Hanuman.

Dhanyamalini 

Dhanyamalini was the second wife of Ravana. Her true identity is unknown but some stories refer to her as the daughter of Maya and sister of Mandodari. She was the mother of the great warrior Atikaya, who was ultimately slain by Lakshman by the Brahmastra.

Dhumraksha 
Dhumraksha was a maternal uncle of Ravana. He was one of ten sons of Sumali. Dhumraksha was killed by Hanuman.

Dushana
Dushana was a man-eating rakshasa. He is the twin brother of Khara, younger male cousin of Ravana, and son of Kaikesi's sister Raka. They were demons who ruled the Dandaka Forest. After Lakshmana humiliated Shurpanakha by cutting off her nose and ears, Khara and Dushana went to war against Lakshmana and Rama. During this fight, Dushana was killed by Rama.

G

Ganga 

Ganga is a goddess and the daughter of Himavan. Because of her incomparable beauty, she was given to the Devas, and she became the Milky Way. Later, Shiva brought her down to earth and she became the holy river, Ganga in Hinduism.

H

Hanuman 

Hanuman is a divine vanara companion and devotee of the god Rama. Hanuman is one of the central characters of the epic. He is a brahmachari (life long celibate) and one of the chiranjeevis. In some versions of the epic, he is described as an avatar of Shiva.

Hema
Hema is an apsara in Indra's court. When Mayasura visited svarga, he saw and married her. They had 2 sons, Mayavi and Dundubhi, and a daughter Mandodari. She later left them and returned to heaven.

I

Indrajit 

Indrajit or Meghanada was a prince of Lanka and possessor of Indra Loka (Heaven). In the epic, he is described as a great warrior and master of illusions. He was the elder son of Ravana. He was born to Ravana's elder consort Mandodari. He is a atimaharathi. He was named Indrajit by Brahma, after he defeated Indra and took over Indra Loka..

J

Jambavan 

Jambavan is described as a king of sloth bear. He was created by Brahma, to assist Rama in his struggle against Ravana.

Janaka 

Janaka was the king of Mithila and the father of Sita and Urmila. He was a wise and kind king.

Jambumali 
Jambumali was one of the eight sons of Lanka's commander-in-chief Prahasta. He was killed by Hanuman during the encounter in Ashok Vatika.

Jatayu 

In the epic, Jatayu is a divine bird and the younger son of Aruṇa. He was an old friend of Dasharatha (Rama's father). Jatayu was killed by Ravana when he tried to save Sita during her abduction.

K

Kabandha
Kabandha is a Rakshasa (demon) who is killed and freed from a curse by Rama.

Kaikashi 
Kaikashi or Kaikeshi or keshani or Pushpothkatha was the wife of sage Vishrava, and mother of  Ravana, Kumbhakarna, Vibhishana and Shurpanakha. She was a daughter of a Rakshasa king Sumali.

Kaikeyi 

Kaikeyi was the third wife of King Dasharatha, and mother of Bharata. She is famed for her beauty. After she saved the life of Dasaratha in battle, he offered to grant anything she would ask of him. She later calls in this favor to have Bharata crowned king and Rama sent into the forest, inspired by the words of her maid, Manthara.

Kausalya 

In the epic, Kausalya is the mother of Rama and the first consort of King Dashratha. She is also described to be the king's favourite wife.

Kewat 

Kewat was a boatman who had taken Rama, Sita and Lakshmana in his boat and crossed river Ganga.

Khara
Khara was a man-eating rakshasa. He is the twin brother of Dushana, younger male cousin of Ravana, and son of Kaikesi's sister Raka. He was killed by Rama, along with his brother Lakshmana when he attacked Rama after Shurpanakha's humiliation. After Lakshmana cut off Shurpanakha's nose, Khara fought against Lakshmana and Rama. During this fight, Khara lost and was killed by Rama, who also killed his brothers Dushana and Trishiras. He was the ruler of the Danda Kingdom, roughly equivalent to the Nashik district, with Janasthana (Nashik city) as its capital. He protected the northern kingdom of Lanka on the mainland and his kingdom bordered the Kosala Kingdom, the kingdom of Rama. He was well known for his superior skills in warfare. In the Ramayana war, between Rama and Ravana, Khara's son, Makaraksha, fought on his uncle, Ravana's side, and was killed by Rama.

Kumbhakarna 

Kumbhakarna was 2nd son of Vishrava and Kaikasi. He was the younger brother of Ravana and the elder brother of Vibhisana and Surpanakha. Despite his gigantic size and great appetite, he was described to be of good character and a great warrior in those times. When offered a boon by Brahma, he was tricked into asking for eternal sleep. A horrified Ravana, out of brotherly love, persuaded Brahma to amend the boon. Brahma mitigated the power of the boon by making Kumbhakarna sleep for six months and being awake for the rest six months of a year (in some versions, he is awake for one day out of the year). He was one of the Rakshasas who opposed Ravana's abduction of Sita.

Kusha 

Along with Lava, Kusha was the other son of Rama and Sita.

L

Lakshmana 

3rd son of King Dasharatha, and half-brother of Rama. He was the twin brother of Shatrughna. They were born to queen Sumitra. He was an incarnation of Sesha Naga. He was deeply devoted to his brother, whom he followed through many dangerous adventures and quests. He was married to Sita's younger sister, Urmila. He guarded his brother Rama and Sita for 14 years day night without sleeping.

Lava 

Lava is one of the two was sons of Rama and Sita. He had a twin brother named Kusha, one of the youths to whom Valmiki taught the Ramayana.

M

Malyavan 

Malyavan was a maternal granduncle of Ravana. He was one of three sons of Sukesha. He had two younger brothers named Sumali and Mali. Malyavan's wife was Sundari. She had seven sons - Vajra Mushti Viroopaaksh, Durmukh, Suptaghn, Yagyakop, Matt, and Unmatt; and one daughter named Analaa. He was one of the Rakshasas who opposed Ravana's abduction of Sita.

Mandavi 

Mandavi is the daughter of King Kushadhwaja and Queen Chandrabhaga. She was a cousin of Sita and Urmila. She also had a younger sister named Shrutakirti. Mandavi was married to Rama's brother Bharata. After the Ramayana, she became the Queen of Gandhara and had two sons, Pushkala and Taksha, who founded Peshawar, then called Purushapura, and Takshasila, now called Taxila, respectively.

Mandodari 

Mandodari was the elder consort of Ravana. The epic describes her as beautiful, pious, and righteous. Mandodari was the daughter of Mayasura and an apsara named Hema. Mandodari bears two sons: Meghanada (Indrajit) and Akshayakumara. She was one of the Rakshasas who opposed Ravana's abduction of Sita.

Manthara 

Manthara is said to be hunch-backed, ugly and antagonistic in appearance. Manthara, it appears, is an expert talker and a cunning woman who can manipulate her way to get what she wants. When Rama is going to become the king of Ayodhya, many deities consulted Lord Vishnu. They said "Rama is going to become king. He will enjoy his life. But the reason behind his introduction is to kill evil." Lord Vishnu expressed his helplessness, so they consulted Saraswathi, the Goddess of education. She went in the form of Manthara (Kekaya)and sent Rama to forests. Manthara is said to be the incarnation of Alakshmi, the eternal consort of Kali Purusha. In her earlier life, she had done penance unto Lord Rudra and accumulated virtue to become one among many celestial dancers/apsaras in Swarga Loka. Knowing well that she was an evil soul, Brahma ordained her to take birth as Manthara and create hurdles in establishing Rama Rajya on earth during Treta Yuga.

Maricha

Maricha is a rakshasa (demon), who is killed by Rama, the hero of the epic, and an avatar of God Vishnu. He is mentioned as an ally of Ravana, the antagonist of the epic. His most notable exploit is his role in the kidnapping of Sita, Rama's wife. His mother was Tataka and brother was Subahu who were killed by Rama earlier in the story.

N

Nala 

Nala was a Vanara who helped Rama during his war with Ravana. He is credited as the engineer of the Rama Setu. He was a son of Vishvakarma, and the twin brother of Nila.

Narantaka 

Narantaka was a son of Ravana. He was killed by Angada.

Nila 

Nila is the commander-in-chief of the vanara army in Rama's battle against Ravana. Along with his twin brother Nala, he is also credited for constructing the Ram Setu. Nila is the son of Agni.

Nishada Raja
Nishada Raja is the king of the forest tribes and also a childhood friend of Rama.

Nirvani 
Nirvani is a Yakshini and niece of Yaksha king Suketu.

P

Parshurama
He is present in the Ramayana due to the conflict with Rama (the protagonist of the Ramayana) over Lord Shiva's broken bow, and expressed his anger by threatening to kill the ones present in the wedding assembly and the entire kingdom of Mithila region. Later after hearing Lord Rama's calm reaction to Parshurama's anger, Parshurama calmed down and finally realized that Lord Rama was an avatar of Vishnu.

Prahasta 

Prahasta was a maternal uncle of Ravana and chief commander of Lanka's army. He was a son of Sumali and Ketumati. He had 9 brothers and four sisters. One of his sister was Ravana's mother Kaikesi

R

Rama 

Rama is the protagonist of the epic. He is an avatar of Vishnu. He was the son of King Dasharatha of the Kosala Kingdom and his eldest consort, Kaushalya. He is a virtuous, strong, and a just man in his own right. He marries Princess Sita of Mithila. The crux of the epic details his attempts to rescue her from Ravana's clutches at Lanka.

Ravana 

Ravana was the rakshasa king of Lanka. He is the main antagonist of the epic. He was the son of Vishrava and Kaikashi. He performed penance for the Shiva for many years.

Rishyasringa 

Rishyasringa was a great Rishi he presided over the sacrifice that King Dasharatha offered in order to get a son. He was married to Dasharath's daughter Shanta. He is sometimes depicted as a combination of a Deer and a Man.

Ruma

Rumā was the wife of Sugriva. She is mentioned in Book IV (Kishkindha Kanda) of the epic. Ruma and Sugriva fell in love with each other and wanted to marry each other. But Ruma's father did not approve. Hence, Sugriva with the help of  Hanuman abducted Ruma and they married each other. Ruma was taken away from Sugriva by Vāli following the strife of two royal Vānara brothers. Later, the fact of Rumā being withheld by Vāli became the primary justification of Rama's slaying Vāli and helping Sugrīva to become the sovereign of Kishkindha. When accused by Vāli of lowly, treacherous and unexpected assassination from the shades by Rama's arrow, Rāma says his assassination was a just punishment for the sin Vāli committed when he robbed Sugrīva of Rumā, his wedded spouse, and used her for his own pleasure.

S

Sampati

Sampati was a supporter of Rama. He was the brother of Jatayu and the son of Aruna.To help Shri Ram, he traced Sita with his divine vision and told Shri Ram that Sita was in Lanka

Shanta 

Shanta was the daughter of a king Dasharatha and his elder consort Kaushalya. Later she was adopted by king Romapada of Anga Pradesh. She was married to sage Rishyasringa.

Shabari 

Shabari is described as an elderly ascetic who was devoted to Rama. As her guru Matanga had instructed her to worship Rama, she waited for him for several years. Sabari finally met Rama after the abduction of Sita. She helped Rama to find Sugriva and Hanuman.

Shatrughna 

Shatrughna was the youngest son of King Dasharatha. He was born to queen Sumitra and was a twin brother of Lakshmana. He was married to Sita's cousin Shrutakirti with whom he had two children.

Shiva 

Shiva played an important role in the epic. Both Rama and Ravana were great to devote to Shiva. Shiva is part of the great trinity in Hinduism, along with Vishnu and Brahma. Some versions of the epic also describe Hanuman as one of the avatars of Shiva. Shiva is a great ascetic and often sits in meditation. It is believed that he is able to tame the power of other gods, devas, and supernatural beings, and he often grants blessings and wishes to those who sit in dedication meditation ('Tapasya'). His wife is Parvati.

Shrutakirti
Shrutakirti or Shrutakeerti is the daughter of king Kushadhwaja and queen Chandrabhaga. She was a cousin of Sita and Urmila. She also had an elder sister Mandavi. Shrutakirti was married to Rama's brother Shatrughna.

Shurpanakha 

Shurpanakha was the daughter of Vishrava and Kaikashi; and the younger sister of Ravana. She met Rama during one such visit to the forest of Panchavati and was instantly smitten by his youthful good looks. Rama meanwhile kindly rejected her advances, telling her that he was faithful to his wife Sita and thus would never take another wife. Rejected, Shurpanakha then approached his younger brother, Lakshmana, who also rejected her, the humiliated and envious Shurpanakha attacked Sita but was thwarted by Lakshmana, who cut off her nose and left ear and sent her back to Lanka.

Sita 

Sita is the principal female character of the epic. The reincarnation of Vedavati, Sita was raised by King Janaka of Mithila as his own daughter. She married Rama of Ayodhya and accompanied him on his exile. She is famed for her virtue and beauty and is regarded as an avatar of the goddess of prosperity, Lakshmi.

Subahu
Subahu is a rakshasa. He and his mother, Tataka, took immense pleasure in harassing the munis of the jungle, especially Vishvamitra, by disrupting their yajnas with rains of flesh and blood. Vishvamitra approached Dasharatha for help in getting rid of these pestilences. Dasharatha obliged by sending two of his sons, Rama and Lakshmana, to the forest with Vishvamitra, charging them to protect both the sage and his sacrificial fires. When Subahu and Maricha again attempted to rain flesh and blood on the sage's yajna, Subahu was killed by Rama.

Sugriva 

Sugriva was a Vanara. He was the younger brother of Vali, whom he succeeded as ruler of the vanara the kingdom of Kishkindha. Rumā was his wife. He was the spiritual son of Surya. Sugriva aided Rama in his quest to liberate his wife Sita from the captivity at the hands of Ravana.

Suketu
Suketu was a yaksha who performed a yajna to get an heir, with the strength equal to thousand elephants. After the ritual, he got a daughter named Tataka.

Sumali 
Sumali was the son of demon king Sukesa and Gandharva princess Devavati. He had two brothers Malyavana and Mali. Sumali was married to Ketumati with whom he had ten sons (Prahasta, Akampana, Vikata, Kalikamukha, Dhumraksha, Danda, Suprasva, Sanhradi, Praghasa, and Bhaskarna) and four daughters (Raka, Puspotkata, Kaikashi, Kumbhnashi). One of his daughters Kaikashi was married to sage Vishrava who later gave birth to Ravana, Kumbhakarna, Vibhishana, and Shurpanakha.

Sumantra
Sumantra, also known as Arya Sumantra, was the prime minister in the court of Ayodhya. He was extremely loyal to the rulers of Ayodhya and was King Dasharatha's a most trusted minister. He knew many secrets about the royal family, including what he had heard from the conversation between King Dasharatha and Maharishi Durvasa. He helped Rama in his exile.

Sumitra 

Sumitra is the third consort of King Dasharatha of Ayodhya. She is the mother of twins Lakshmana and Shatrughna.

T

Tara 

Tara was the wife of Vali, and the mother of Angada. She was the queen of Kishkindha and is regarded as one of the panchakanyas.

Tataka 

Tataka was a beautiful woman who was transformed into a demon (rakshasa) once she tried to seduce the sage Agastya. As a demon, she used to drink the blood of living creatures and used to kill anything she sees. In one of Rama's few great acts, he broke her curse by slaying her.

Trijata

Trijata is a demoness who was assigned the duty of guarding Sita who was kidnapped by the king of Lanka. In later adaptions of Ramayana, she is described as the daughter of Vibhishana.

Trijata appears as a wise rakshasi, who dreams of Ravana's destruction and Rama's victory. She accompanies Sita on a survey of the battlefield of the war between Rama and Ravana and reassures Sita of Rama's well-being when Sita sees her husband unconscious and presumes him dead.

Trishira 

Trishira was a son of Ravana. He was killed by Hanuman.

U

Urmila 

She was the younger daughter of Janaka and the younger sister of Sita and Mandavi. She married Lakshamana and they had two sons. She lived 14 years without Lakshamana and waited for him.

V

Vali 

Vali or Baali was a powerful king of Kishkindha. He was a spiritual son of Indra, the biological son of Vriksharaja, the elder brother of Sugriva, husband of Tara and father of Angada.

Vasishtha 

Vasishtha was a sage and the guru of King Dasharatha, he used to offer religious advice to the king and the royal family.

Vibhishana 

Vibhishana was a younger brother of Ravana. Though a rakshasa himself, Vibhishana was of a noble character. When Ravana kidnapped Sita, he advised Ravana to return her to her husband Rama in an orderly fashion and promptly which Ravana refused sternly. When Ravana did not heed his advice and threw him out of the kingdom, Vibhishana deserted Ravana and joined Rama's army. Later, when Rama defeated Ravana, Rama crowned Vibhishana as the king of Lanka.

Vishrava 

Vishrava was the son of Pulatsya, the brother of celebrated sage Agastya Muni and the grandson of Brahma. Vishrava was married twice. Once with Ilavida with whom he had a son named Kubera and his second consort was a Rakshasa princess Kaikashi with whom he had three sons (Ravana, Kumbhakarna & Vibhishana) and a daughter (Shurpanakha).

Vishvamitra 

Vishvamitra was a great sage and wise man who was once a king. Through long meditation, he gained a number of spiritual powers. He took Rama on a quest to defeat a demon and to lift the bow of Shiva, the first step in the future king's journey.

References

 Ramayana
Characters in the Ramayana
Lists of character lists